In music, Op. 34 stands for Opus number 34. Compositions that are assigned this number include:

 Arnold – The Dancing Master
 Brahms – Piano Quintet
 Britten – The Young Person's Guide to the Orchestra
 Chopin – Waltzes, Op. 34
 Dvořák – String Quartet No. 9
 Eberl – Symphony in D minor
 Ginastera – Bomarzo
 Grieg – Two Elegiac Melodies
 Hanson – Symphony No. 4
 Nielsen – Aladdin
 Prokofiev– Overture on Hebrew Themes
 Rachmaninoff – 14 Songs
 Rimsky – Capriccio Espagnol
 Schumann – 4 Duets (soprano and tenor with piano)
 Shostakovich – 24 Preludes
 Suk – Ripening
 Szymanowski – Masques
 Tchaikovsky – Valse-Scherzo
 Weber – Clarinet Quintet